All By Students (ABS) Notebooks is a college marketing company that partners with universities across the United States to spearhead a free school supplies initiative for students.

Their flagship product, a free multi-subject notebook, is given to university students at the start of every semester. Full-page advertisements act as subject dividers that offer further discounts, thus subsidizing the notebooks for students. As of January 2009, the following brands have participated: 3M, AT&T, Blackberry, CDW, Dell, Dr. Pepper, STA Travel, Discover Card, Ford, GEICO, General Mills, ice.com, Idearc, Kraft, Monster, My Rich Uncle, P & G, Palm, RealNetworks, Saturn, Sears, STA Travel, NBA, Unilever, Vault.com, Volvo, Warner Bros, Western Union, Wrigley, and Yahoo.

The notebooks are designed to reflect the brand of the school distributing by adopting their colors and logo. The first eight pages include college-specific information such as campus maps, important telephone numbers, and academic calendars.

Beginnings
ABS was founded in 2006 by two students studying at the Kellogg School of Management at Northwestern University. Their goal was to  channel brand marketing dollars to products that benefit students and enhance the college learning experience.

Notebook Distribution
At the launch of the program in January 2007, 10,000 students received notebooks at Northwestern University. In fall 2008, ABS distributed notebooks at 65 campuses to 700,000 students. Campuses included Harvard, MIT, Penn State, University of Pennsylvania, Arizona State, California State University Long Beach, Clemson, North Carolina State University, and the University of Arkansas. In January 2009, over 1 million students received the notebooks on 100 campuses.

Press

Business Press:

 Sustainability: The Journal of Record 
 Post Advertising: Rock Solid ABS
 Brandweek: The Latest Marketing Vehicle: School Supplies
 Springwise: More free love: notebooks for students
 MediaBuyerPlanner: Marketers Woo Thrifty with Free School Supplies
 Geekpreneur: How to Give your Product Away and Still Make it Pay

University Press:

 University of Pennsylvania: 12,000 free reasons to go to class this year
 Massachusetts Institute of Technology: First-year Students Enjoy MIT Orientation
 Northwestern University: Kellogg Alumni Fill Student Need With Free Notebooks
 Rochester Institute of Technology: Free Notebooks on the Quarter Mile
 Marshall University: Students to receive notebooks
 Western Illinois University: Free SGA notebooks relieve students of extra expenses
 Southern Illinois University Carbondale: SIUC Student Center

Defunct
Their last year of operation seems to have been 2009.

Their Facebook account is idle
(most recent posting was November 12, 2010).
The web domains allbystudents.com and absnotebooks.com
both redirect to https://web.archive.org/web/20120915161130/http://www.notetag.com/.

References

External links
Official Website
Student Website

Marketing companies of the United States